Neda Alijani (born 1981) is an Iranian infectious disease physician and assistant professor at Tehran University of Medical Sciences. She is a winner of International Prof Yalda Award.

References 

1981 births
Living people
Iranian infectious disease physicians
Academic staff of Tehran University of Medical Sciences
Tehran University of Medical Sciences alumni
Iranian women physicians